Germán Andrés Lanaro Contreras (born March 21, 1986 in Villa Regina, Rio Negro), known as Germán Lanaro, is an Argentine-Chile retired footballer.

Personal life
He's the twin brother of Gustavo Lanaro. They both naturalized Chilean by descent, since their grandmother is Chilean.

Career statistics

Club

Honours

Club
Universidad Católica
 Primera División de Chile: 2016–C, 2016–A, 2018, 2019, 2020, 2021
 Supercopa de Chile: 2016, 2019, 2020, 2021

Notes

References

External links
 
 

1986 births
Living people
People from Villa Regina
Argentine sportspeople of Chilean descent
Argentine people of Italian descent
Argentine footballers
Argentine expatriate footballers
Citizens of Chile through descent
Chilean footballers
Primera Nacional players
Argentine Primera División players
Torneo Argentino A players
Primera B Metropolitana players
Club Atlético Huracán footballers
Guillermo Brown footballers
Villa Mitre footballers
Club Almagro players
Nueva Chicago footballers
Chilean Primera División players
Club Deportivo Palestino footballers
Club Deportivo Universidad Católica footballers
Argentine expatriate sportspeople in Chile
Expatriate footballers in Chile
Association football defenders
Argentine emigrants to Chile
Naturalized citizens of Chile
Sportspeople of Italian descent
Twin sportspeople
Chilean twins